Golden Valley is a rural locality in the local government area of Meander Valley in the Launceston region of Tasmania. The 2016 census determined a population of 231 for the state suburb of Golden Valley.

History
Golden Valley was gazetted as a locality in 1968.

Geography
The watershed of the Cluan Tiers forms the north-eastern boundary.

Road infrastructure
The A5 route (Highland Lakes Road) passes through from north-west to south, where it forms part of the south-east boundary. The C502 route (Golden Valley Road / Bogan Road) starts at an intersection with A5 and runs east, then north, where it exits. The C504 route (an extension of Bogan Road) starts at an intersection with C502 and runs south-east before exiting.

References

Localities of Meander Valley Council
Towns in Tasmania